Tritia cuvierii, common name the one-banded nassa, is a species of sea snail, a marine gastropod mollusk in the family Nassariidae, the Nassa mud snails or dog whelks.

List of synonyms

 Buccinum costulatum Renieri, 1804 (unavailable name: published in a work placed on Official Index by ICZN Opinion 316)
 Buccinum cuvierii Payraudeau, 1826 (original combination)
 Buccinum elegans O. G. Costa, 1830 (invalid: junior homonym of Buccinum elegans J. de C. Sowerby, 1824, and Buccinum elegans Risso, 1826)
 Buccinum ferussaci Payraudeau, 1826 
 Buccinum flexuosum Costa O.G., 1830 
 Buccinum subdiaphanum Bivona Ant., 1832 
 Buccinum variabile Philippi, 1836 
 Buccinum variabile var. media Philippi, 1836 
 Eione sulcata Risso, 1826 (dubious synonym)
 Hima candida Coen, 1937 
 Hinia costulata (Brocchi, 1814)
 Hinia fulva Ghisotti, 1986 
 Hinia juliae Ghisotti, 1986 
 Hinia lopadusae Ghisotti, 1986 
 Hinia phasianella Ghisotti, 1986 
 Hinia pulchella Ghisotti, 1986 
 Hinia signata Ghisotti, 1986 
 Hinia vitrea Coen, 1914 
 Nassa bucquoyi Locard, 1887 (dubious synonym)
 Nassa corrupta Locard & Caziot, 1900 
 Nassa costulata (Renieri, 1804)
 Nassa costulata var. atra Brusina, 1869 
 Nassa costulata var. castanea Brusina, 1869 
 Nassa costulata var. costata Bucquoy, Dautzenberg & Dollfus, 1882  
 Nassa costulata var. flavida Bucquoy, Dautzenberg & Dollfus, 1882  
 Nassa costulata var. lanceolata Bucquoy, Dautzenberg & Dollfus, 1882  
 Nassa costulata var. pulcherrima Bucquoy, Dautzenberg & Dollfus, 1882  
 Nassa costulata var. tenuicosta Bucquoy, Dautzenberg & Dollfus, 1882 
 Nassa costulata var. turgida Bucquoy, Dautzenberg & Dollfus, 1882  
 Nassa costulata var. zonata Brusina, 1869 
 Nassarius (Telasco) cuvierii (Payraudeau, B.-C., 1826)
 Nassa cuvieri [sic] (misspelling of Nassa cuvierii (Payraudeau, 1826))
 Nassa cuvieri var. varicosa Locard, 1887 
 Nassa cuvierii (Payraudeau, 1826)
 Nassa dautzembergi Mari, 1928 
 Nassa encaustica Brusina, 1869 
 Nassa ferussaci (Payraudeau, 1826)
 Nassa ferussaci arcuata Pallary, 1904 
 Nassa ferussaci exigua Pallary, 1904 
 Nassa ferussaci pallaryi Koch in Pallary, 1906 
 Nassa ferussaci var. alexandrina Pallary, 1912 (dubious synonym)
 Nassa ferussaci var. claudoni Pallary, 1906 
 Nassa guernei Locard, 1886 
 Nassa mabillei Locard, 1887 
 Nassa madeirensis Reeve, 1854 
 Nassa semicostata Locard, 1887 
 Nassa subcostulata Locard, 1886 (dubious synonym)
 Nassa turgida (Bucquoy, Dautzenberg & Dollfus, 1882 )
 Nassa turgida var. compacta Pallary, 1912 
 Nassarius cuvierii (Payraudeau, 1826)
 Planaxis beudantiana Risso, 1826 
 Planaxis fitcheliana Risso, 1826 
 Planaxis lineolata Risso, 1826 
 Planaxis loques Risso, 1826 
 Planaxis molliana Risso, 1826 
 Planaxis riparia Risso, 1826 
 Planaxis tenuis Risso, 1826

Description
The length of the shell varies from 9 mm to 20 mm.

The small shell is ovate, conical, rather shining, and pointed. The spire is formed of six or seven indistinct whorls, often ornamented with longitudinal folds, which are rarely continued to the base of the body whorl, and which are crossed by very fine and slightly marked transverse striae. The aperture is white. The outer lip is thick, white externally, and denticulated within. The columella is smooth and shows two guttules at the base. The coloring of the shell is very various. The ground color is generally of a yellowish white. The transverse striae are accompanied with very fine lines, white and of a red bay color.  Reddish, or bluish brown spots, intersected with white, form zones upon the upper part of each whorl. At the base, and the middle of the lowest, the brown lines are more marked.

Distribution
This species occurs in the Mediterranean Sea and in the Atlantic Ocean off the Azores.

References

External links
 
 Payraudeau, B. C. (1826). Catalogue descriptif et méthodique des annelides et des mollusques de l'Ile de Corse; avec huit planches représentant quatre-vingt-huit espèces, dont soixante-huit nouvelles. 218 pp. Paris
  Gofas, S.; Le Renard, J.; Bouchet, P. (2001). Mollusca. in: Costello, M.J. et al. (eds), European Register of Marine Species: a check-list of the marine species in Europe and a bibliography of guides to their identification. Patrimoines Naturels. 50: 180-213.
 Cernohorsky, W. O. (1984). Systematics of the family Nassariidae (Mollusca: Gastropoda). Bulletin of the Auckland Institute and Museum. 14: i-iv, 1-356
 Moreno D. & Templado J. (1995). El complejo de especies "Nassarius cuvierii - N. unifasciatus" (Gastropoda, Nassariidae) en el SE de España. Iberus. 12(2): 33-47
 Adam, W. & Knudsen, J. (1984). Révision des Nassariidae (Mollusca: Gastropoda Prosobranchia) de l'Afrique occidentale. Bulletin de l'Institut Royal des Sciences Naturelles de Belgique. 55 (9): 1-95, 5 pl
 Galindo, L. A.; Puillandre, N.; Utge, J.; Lozouet, P.; Bouchet, P. (2016). The phylogeny and systematics of the Nassariidae revisited (Gastropoda, Buccinoidea). Molecular Phylogenetics and Evolution. 99: 337-353

Nassariidae
Gastropods described in 1826